
Lago Retico is a lake in the canton Ticino, Switzerland.

Retico